Seahouses is a large village on the North Northumberland coast in England.

Attraction
Seahouses attracts many visitors, mainly from the north east area. However national and international tourists often come to Seahouses whilst visiting the Northumberland National Park, Northumberland Coast and the Farne Islands. Seahouses also has a working fishing port, which also serves the tourist trade, being the embarkation point for visits to the Farne Islands. From shops in the town and booths along the harbour, several boat companies operate, offering various packages which may include inter alia landing on at least one Farne, seeing seals and seabirds, and hearing a commentary on the islands and the Grace Darling story or scuba diving on the many Farne Islands wrecks. Grace Darling's brother is buried in the cemetery at North Sunderland. He died in 1903, aged 84. The current Seahouses lifeboat bears the name Grace Darling.

The Seahouses Festival is an annual cultural event which began in 1999 as a small sea shanty festival. After a significant European funding grant from the Leader+ programme,  in 2005, it has grown into a more broadly based cultural celebration.

 There are claims that kippers were first created in Seahouses in the 1800s, and they are still produced locally to this day.

Between 1898 and 1951, Seahouses was the north-eastern terminus of the North Sunderland Railway. Independent until its final closure, it formed a standard gauge rail link between the village and Chathill Station on the East Coast Main Line. The site of Seahouses station is now the town car park and the trackbed between village and North Sunderland is a public footpath.

Governance
Seahouses is within the civil parish of North Sunderland and the Northumberland County Council electoral division of Bamburgh, The parliamentary constituency is Berwick-upon-Tweed, represented by MP Anne-Marie Trevelyan (Conservative).

Religion
Seahouses is in the Anglican archdeaconry of Lindisfarne, in the Diocese of Newcastle. It is in the Roman Catholic Diocese of Hexham and Newcastle.

See also

References

Sources
 Wright, A., (1988), The North Sunderland Railway, The Oakwood Press, Locomotion Papers No. 36,

External links

 farne.co.uk Local information on Seahouses, North Sunderland and the Farne Islands
 Community website
 Seahouses official website
 Visit Northumberland
 Northumberland Communities (Accessed: 7 November 2008) 	

Villages in Northumberland
Populated coastal places in Northumberland